Head cutting may refer to:
 Guitar battle
 Head cut (stream geomorphology), an erosional feature in some intermittent and perennial streams with an abrupt vertical drop